Ladwa could refer to one of these:

 Ladwa, a town in the Kurukshetra district of Haryana, India
 Ladwa (Vidhan Sabha constituency)
 Ladwa, Hisar, a village in the Hisar district of Haryana, India